The following is a list of notable people who have lived in Knoxville, Tennessee. For University of Tennessee students and alumni not otherwise associated with Knoxville, see List of University of Tennessee people.

Art and architecture

 Charles I. Barber (1887–1962), architect
 George Franklin Barber (1854–1915), architect
 Albert Baumann, Jr. (1897–1952), architect
 Albert Baumann, Sr. (1861–1942), architect
 Joseph Baumann (1844–1920), architect
 Lloyd Branson (1853–1925), painter
 Darby Conley (b. 1970), cartoonist, Get Fuzzy
 Beauford Delaney (1901–1979), painter
 Joseph Delaney (1904–1991), painter
 R. F. Graf (1865–1929), architect
 Thomas Hope (1757–1820), architect
 Dennis Hwang (b. 1978), graphic artist for Google and Niantic
 Joseph Knaffl (1861–1938), photographer
 Adelia Armstrong Lutz (1859–1931), painter
 Bruce McCarty (1920–2013), architect
 T. M. Schleier (1832–1908), photographer
 Catherine Wiley (1879–1958), painter

Business and industry
 Alexander Arthur (1846–1912), entrepreneur
 Jake Butcher (1936-2017), rogue banker and gubernatorial candidate 
 Eldad Cicero Camp (1839–1920), coal tycoon
 Ashley Capps (b. 1955), AC Entertainment founder, co-creator of Bonnaroo Music Festival
 George Dempster (1887–1964), inventor of the Dempster-Dumpster, mayor of Knoxville
 Guilford Glazer (1921–2014), real estate developer and philanthropist
 Dee Haslam (b. 1954), CEO of RIVR Media
 Jim Haslam (b. 1930), founder of Pilot Corp.
 Jimmy Haslam (b. 1954), owner of the Cleveland Browns
 Cal Johnson (1844–1925), saloon and racetrack owner
 Peter Kern (1835–1907), confectioner, founder of Kern's Bakery
 Joseph Alexander Mabry, Jr. (1826–1882), entrepreneur
 Charles McClung McGhee (1828–1907), railroad tycoon
 William J. Oliver (1867–1925), contractor and manufacturer, original low bidder for the construction of the Panama Canal
 Edward J. Sanford (1831–1902), manufacturing tycoon
 James G. Sterchi (1867–1932), furniture tycoon
 Dave Thomas (1932–2002), restaurant owner, founder of Wendy's
 Cas Walker (1902–1998), grocery store magnate, radio and television personality
 Chris Whittle (b. 1947), entrepreneur, founder of Channel One News and Edison Schools

Education
 Eben Alexander (1851–1910), Greek language scholar and ambassador
 Charles W. Cansler (1871–1953), Austin High School principal, civil rights advocate and author
 Thomas William Humes (1815–1892), president of the University of Tennessee (1865–1883)
 Harcourt Morgan (1867–1950), president of the University of Tennessee (1919–1934), director and chairman of the Tennessee Valley Authority

Entertainment

 Kelsea Ballerini (b. 1993), singer-songwriter
 Bianca Belair (b. 1989), professional wrestler
 Polly Bergen (1930–2014), actress, singer
 Natalie Bible' (b. 1983), film director
 Clarence Brown (1890–1987), film director
 Archie Campbell (1914–1987), television personality
 Henry Cho (b. 1961), comedian, actor
 Simeon Coxe (1938-2020), musician, pioneer of synth-pop music
 Cylk Cozart (b. 1957), actor
 John Cullum (b. 1930), Tony Award-winning actor and singer
 Dale Dickey (b. 1961), actress
 Harry Fujiwara (1935-2016), better known as "Mr. Fuji," professional wrestler
 Christina Hendricks (b. 1975), actress
 Glenn Jacobs (b. 1967), better known as "Kane," professional wrestler, Knox County mayor 
 Jeff Jarrett (b. 1967), professional wrestler
 David Keith (b. 1954), actor
 Johnny Knoxville (b. 1971), actor and daredevil, changed his last name in reference to his hometown
 Jamie Marchi (b. 1977), actress
 Patricia Neal (1926–2010), Academy Award-winning actress
 Lillian Randolph (1898–1980), actress
 Brad Renfro (1982–2008), actor
 Quentin Tarantino (b. 1963), Academy Award-winning screenwriter and director
 Bob Thomas (b. 1954), radio personality, actor, writer
 Jake Thomas (b. 1990), actor
 Tina Wesson (b. 1960), contestant, Survivor television series; winner of Survivor: The Australian Outback

Military

 David Farragut (1801–1870), Civil War (Union) admiral
 Norman C. Gaddis (b. 1923), Air Force general and Vietnam War POW
 Thomas C. Hindman (1828–1868), Civil War (Confederate) general
 Bruce K. Holloway (1912–1999), Commander-in-Chief of the Strategic Air Command (1968–1972)
 Lawrence Tyson (1861–1929), World War I general and United States Senator
 Maurice F. Weisner (1917–2006), Admiral, Commander-in-Chief of United States Pacific Command, 1976–1979

Music

 Roy Acuff (1903–1992), country music singer
 Sheila Aldridge (b. 1956), country music singer, the Aldridge Sisters
 Sherry Aldridge (b. 1954), country music singer, the Aldridge Sisters
 Chet Atkins (1924–2001), country music guitarist
 Rodney Atkins (b. 1969), country musician
 Kelsea Ballerini (b. 1993), country music artist
 Ava Barber (b. 1954), country music singer, featured performer from The Lawrence Welk Show
 Dave Barnes (b. 1978), singer/songwriter/musician
 Brian Bell (b. 1968), guitarist for the band Weezer
 Didi Benami (b. 1986), singer/songwriter, top-ten American Idol finalist
 Chris Blue (b. 1990), singer/songwriter, The Voice season 12 winner
 Kenny Chesney (b. 1968), country musician
 Ashley Cleveland (b. 1957), gospel musician
 Mary Costa (b. 1930), opera singer, voice of Briar Rose / Princess Aurora in Disney's 1959 classic Sleeping Beauty
 Jerome Courtland (1926–2012), actor and director
 John Davis (b. 1974), musician, lead singer of Superdrag
 The Dirty Works, punk band 
 Don Everly (b. 1937), early rock-and-roll singer, the Everly Brothers
 Phil Everly (1939–2014), early rock-and-roll singer, the Everly Brothers
 Con Hunley (b. 1945), country music artist
 Phil Leadbetter (b. 1962), bluegrass musician
 Briston Maroney (b. 1998), folk rock musician
 Harry McClintock (1882–1957), folk musician, "Big Rock Candy Mountain"
 Mary McDonald, sacred music composer
 Brownie McGhee (1915–1996), blues musician
 Stick McGhee (1917–1961), blues musician
 Ashley Monroe (b. 1986), country singer
 Grace Moore (1898–1947), opera singer
 Joseph Patrick Moore (b. 1969), jazz composer, bassist, arranger, producer
 Nick Raskulinecz, Grammy-winning record producer
 Florence Reece (1900–1986), folk songwriter; coal mining labor activist
 Emily Ann Roberts (b. 1998), singer/songwriter, The Voice runner-up
 Brent Smith (b. 1978), rock singer, lead vocalist for Shinedown
 Richard Aaker Trythall (b. 1939), composer and pianist
 Myra Brooks Turner (1936-2017), composer
 10 Years, alternative rock band
 Whitechapel, Deathcore band

Politics and law

 Robert H. Adams (1792–1830), United States Senator from Mississippi
 Alexander O. Anderson (1794–1869), United States Senator
 Victor Ashe (b. 1945), former mayor, U.S. Ambassador to Poland
 George W. Baxter (1855–1929), territorial governor of Wyoming
 William Blount (1749–1800), Constitutional Convention delegate, Governor of the Southwest Territory, United States Senator
 William G. "Parson" Brownlow (1805–1877), publisher of the Knoxville Whig, Governor of Tennessee, United States Senator
 John Hervey Crozier (1812–1889), U.S. congressman
 James Alexander Fowler (1863–1955), U.S. Assistant Attorney General and Knoxville mayor
 Lizzie Crozier French (1851–1926), women's suffragist
 Lucius F. C. Garvin (1841–1922), former Governor of Rhode Island
 Sion Harris (1811–1854), member of the Liberian legislature
 Bill Haslam (b. 1958), Governor of Tennessee, former Mayor of Knoxville
 William H. Hastie (1904–1976), U.S. Virgin Islands governor, first African American federal appellate court judge
 Leonidas Houk (1836–1891), U.S. congressman
 Sam Houston (1793–1863), Governor of Tennessee, President of the Republic of Texas, Governor of Texas, United States Senator
 Ray Jenkins (1897–1980), attorney, Senate counsel during the Army-McCarthy Hearings
 Horace Maynard (1814–1882), U.S. congressman and postmaster general
 William Gibbs McAdoo (1863–1941), U.S. Secretary of the Treasury
 Lee McClung (1870–1914), U.S. Treasurer
 John Randolph Neal, Jr. (1876–1959), law professor, Scopes Trial attorney
 T.A.R. Nelson (1812–1873), U.S. congressman
 John Reinhardt (1920–2016), diplomat
 Glenn Reynolds (b. 1960), legal academic and blogger
 James Herman Robinson (1907–1972), clergyman, founder of Operation Crossroads Africa
 Edward Terry Sanford (1865–1930), U.S. Supreme Court justice
 John Sevier (1745–1815), pioneer and soldier, first Governor of Tennessee
 William Henry Sneed (1812–1869), U.S. congressman
 Oliver Perry Temple (1820–1907), attorney, judge, and historian
 Hugh Lawson White (1773–1840), United States Senator, presidential candidate
 James White (1747–1820), pioneer, founder of Knoxville
 John Williams (1778–1837), United States Senator
 William F. Yardley (1844–1924), attorney, first African American to run for governor of Tennessee

Science

 William M. Bass, (b. 1928), founder of the University of Tennessee's Body Farm; author of Death's Acre
 Randall Collins (b. 1941), sociologist and author
 Weston Fulton (1871–1946), meteorologist, inventor
 Jack Hanna (b. 1947), zoologist
 Gerald North (b. 1938), climatologist
 Helen Smith, forensic psychologist

Sports

 Erik Ainge (b. 1986), former NFL quarterback and sports radio personality
 Trevor Bayne (b. 1991), NASCAR driver and 2011 Daytona 500 winner
 Chad Bell (b. 1989), Major League Baseball player
 Ralph Boston (b. 1939), Olympic athlete
 John Bruhin (b. 1964), NFL player
 Ken Burkhart (1916–2004), MLB player and umpire
 Brett Carroll (b. 1982), MLB player
 Joey Clinkscales (b. 1964), NFL player and executive
 Reggie Cobb (1968–2019), NFL running back
 Mike Cofer (1960–2019), NFL linebacker
 Tony Cosey (b. 1974), All-American cross country and track runner; Olympic athlete in the steeplechase at the 2000 Sydney Olympic Games
 Cartha Doyle (b. 1929), All-American Girls Professional Baseball League player
 Chad Finchum, NASCAR driver
 Phillip Fulmer (b. 1950), former head coach of Tennessee Volunteers football team
 Ray Graves (1918–2015), former NFL player and head coach at Florida
 Anthony Hancock (b. 1960), former NFL player
 Todd Helton (b. 1973), Major League Baseball player 
 Adam Henley (b. 1994), professional soccer player
 Paul Hogue (1940–2009), former NBA player
 Scott Holtzman (b. 1983), mixed martial artist and Ultimate Fighting Championship competitor
 Garth Iorg (b. 1954), Major League Baseball player and coach
 Tim Irwin (b. 1958), former NFL offensive lineman
 Todd Kelly (b. 1970), NFL linebacker
 Peter Kreis (1900–1934), race car driver
 Terry McDaniel (b. 1965), NFL defensive back
 Raleigh McKenzie (b. 1963), NFL lineman
 Reggie McKenzie (b. 1963), NFL linebacker, General Manager of the Oakland Raiders
 Kathleen Malach (1926–2011), All-American Girls Professional Baseball League player
 Billy Meyer (1893–1957), Major League Baseball player and manager
 Robert Neyland (1892–1962), University of Tennessee football coach
 Kevin O'Connell (b. 1985), NFL player
 Rafaello Oliveira (b. 1982), mixed martial artist and Ultimate Fighting Championship competitor
 Peter Oppegard (b. 1959), Olympic figure skater
 Randy Orton (b. 1980), professional wrestler, actor
 Chad Pennington (b. 1976), NFL quarterback
 Jerry Punch (b. 1953), ESPN analyst
 Fuad Reveiz (b. 1963), NFL placekicker
 Ovince St. Preux (b. 1983), mixed martial artist and Ultimate Fighting Championship competitor
 Doris Sams (1927–2012), All-American Girls Professional Baseball League player
 Aaron Schoenfeld (b. 1990), American-Israeli Major League Soccer player
 Steve Searcy (b. 1964), former Major League Baseball pitcher
 Harrison Smith (b. 1989), NFL safety for Minnesota Vikings
 Lee Smith (b. 1987), NFL tight end
 Pat Summitt (1952–2016), former head coach, Tennessee Lady Vols basketball team
 Davis Tarwater (b. 1984), Olympic swimmer
 John Tate (1955–1998), Olympic and professional boxer
 Ben Testerman (b. 1962), professional tennis player
 Leroy Thompson (b. 1968), former NFL running back
 Bubba Trammell (b. 1971), Major League Baseball player
 Elston Turner (b. 1959), NBA player and coach
 Jackie Walker (1950–2002), All-American linebacker at Tennessee
 Josh Walker (b. 1991) NFL guard
 Jason Witten (b. 1982), NFL tight end
 Chris Woodruff (b. 1973), professional tennis player

Writers and journalists

 James Agee (1909–1955), Pulitzer Prize-winning author
 Paul Y. Anderson (1893–1938), Pulitzer Prize-winning investigative reporter
 Anne W. Armstrong (1872–1958), author of This Day and Time (1930)
Carson Brewer (1920–2003), journalist and conservationist
 Frances Hodgson Burnett (1849–1924), author of The Secret Garden
 Albert Chavannes (1836–1903), Utopian philosopher
 Lowell Cunningham (b. 1959), comic book writer, Men in Black creator
 Nikki Giovanni (b. 1943), poet
 Alex Haley (1921–1992), author of Roots
 George Washington Harris (1814–1869), Southern humorist
 Frederick Heiskell (1786–1882), pioneering Tennessee journalist; cofounder of the Knoxville Register
 Ed Hooper (b. 1964), author, journalist
 Joseph Wood Krutch (1893–1970), writer, naturalist
 S.J. Mathes (1849?–1927), pioneer California newspaperman
 Cormac McCarthy (b. 1933), Pulitzer Prize-winning author
 Adolph Ochs (1858–1935), newspaper publisher
 J. G. M. Ramsey (1797–1884), historian
 William Rule (1839–1928), newspaper editor, mayor of Knoxville
 Ed Sams (b. 1952), author and educator
 Bernadotte Schmitt (1886–1969), Pulitzer Prize-winning historian
 Karl Edward Wagner (1945–1994), fantasy writer

Other

 Jane Franklin Hommel Denney (1878–1946), socialite and women's club leader
 Mary Boyce Temple (1856–1929), philanthropist and preservationist
 Adam Ragusea, YouTube Chef

See also
 History of Knoxville, Tennessee
 List of people from Tennessee

References

 
Knoxville, Tennessee
Knoxville